The jougs, juggs, or joggs (from Latin , a yoke) is a metal collar formerly used as an instrument of punishment in Scotland, the Netherlands and other countries.

Purpose 
The jougs was an iron collar fastened by a short chain to a wall, often of the parish church, or to a tree or mercat cross. The collar was placed round the offender's neck and fastened by a padlock. Time spent in the jougs was intended to shame an offender publicly. Jougs were used for ecclesiastical as well as civil offences. Some surviving examples can still be seen in their original locations in Scottish towns and villages. Jougs may be the origin of the later slang word "jug", meaning prison.

Examples 

Sir Walter Scott rescued the jougs from Threave Castle in the Borders and attached them to the castellated gateway he built at Abbotsford House.

In Stewarton, East Ayrshire, the jougs were attached to the old bridge that crossed the burn and connected to the drive that ran up to Corsehill House.

The Sanquhar Tolbooth Museum in the Nith valley has jougs attached to the wall just outside the entrance to the old gaol.

The jougs at Sorn Kirk were stolen in the 1930s, but located and returned. Cuthbertson refers to the jougs as "symbols of the session's power against gossips and evil-doers".

The jougs at Kilallan Kirk near Kilmacolm were stolen and by chance retrieved and donated to the local museum. A story is told of a lady of short stature who was placed in the jougs; however, she fell off the box and was strangled, as the chain was too short for her.

The jougs on the Isle of Cumbrae survive, attached to a gatepost at the entrance to the Millport Old Cemetery entrance.

The "Clachan Oak" is an ancient sessile oak near Balfron in Stirlingshire. It can still be seen bearing metal bands around its trunk to which jougs were once attached for the restraint and humiliation of petty criminals.

Mr. Carse of the Shawhill Estate protected a fine old thorn tree that grew at the Hurlford Bridge end by attaching a pair of jougs to it, made by David Brown the local blacksmith. These were never used, but acted as a deterrent to local children who might have harmed the tree.

Gallery

See also 
 Stool of Repentance
 Scold's bridle 
 Shrew's fiddle

References

External links 

 Video showing the Kilmaurs Jougs
 Video and narration about the Fenwick Jougs
 Bygone Punishments of Scotland by William Andrews 1899 on electricscotland.

Modern instruments of torture
Physical restraint